Third Army may refer to:

Germany 
 3rd Army (German Empire), a World War I field Army
 3rd Army (Wehrmacht), a World War II field army
 3rd Panzer Army

Russia and Soviet Union  
 3rd Army (Russian Empire)
 3rd Army (RSFSR)
 3rd Army (Soviet Union)

Others 
 3rd Army (Austria-Hungary)
 Third Army (Bulgaria)
 3rd Army (France)
 Third Army (Egypt)
 Third Army (Hungary)
 Third Army (Italy)
 Third Army (Japan)
 Third Army (Ottoman Empire)
 Third Army (Romania)
 Third Army (Serbia)
 Third Army (Turkey)
 Third Army (United Kingdom)
 Third Army (Home Forces), also in the United Kingdom
 Third Army (United States)

See also 
 3rd Army Corps (disambiguation)
 3rd Battalion (disambiguation)
 3rd Brigade (disambiguation)
 3rd Division (disambiguation)
 3rd Regiment (disambiguation)
 3rd Squadron (disambiguation)